The Greatest Hits Collection may refer to:

 The Greatest Hits Collection (Bananarama album)
 The Greatest Hits Collection (Brooks & Dunn album)
 The Greatest Hits Collection (Alan Jackson album)
 The Greatest Hits Collection (Michelle Wright album)
 The Greatest Hits Collection (video), a Bananarama videos compilation
 Greatest Hits Collection, Vol. 1, an album released by Trace Adkins
A Collection of His Greatest Hits
The Greatest Hits Collection II
DJ: The Hits Collection
The Greatest Hits Collection (video)

See also
 List of greatest hits albums
Hits Collection (disambiguation)